Robert Heron  may refer to:

 Robert Heron (writer) (1764–1807), Scottish writer
 Sir Robert Heron, 2nd Baronet (1765–1854), British Whig politician, Member of Parliament (MP) for Great Grimsby 1812–18 and Peterborough 1819–47
 Red Heron (1917–1990), nickname of Canadian professional ice hockey player Robert Geatrex Heron